David Michael Carr (September 8, 1956  February 12, 2015) was an American columnist, author, and newspaper editor. He wrote the Media Equation column and covered culture for The New York Times.

Early life
David Michael Carr was born on September 8, 1956 in Minneapolis, to Joan Laura Carr (née O'Neill), a local community leader, and John Lawrence Carr. He had three brothers and three sisters and grew up in the suburb of Minnetonka. He attended the University of Wisconsin–River Falls and the University of Minnesota; he graduated from the latter with a degree in psychology and journalism.

Career
In the early 1980s, Carr got his first job at the alternative weekly Twin Cities Reader where he became its editor. He also edited the Washington City Paper and then later joined the short-lived media news website Inside.com. He wrote extensively about the media for The Atlantic Monthly and New York.

He joined The New York Times in 2002, where he was a cultural reporter and wrote The New York Times Carpetbagger blog. He remained at The New York Times until his death.

In his 2008 memoir, The Night of the Gun, Carr detailed his experiences with cocaine addiction and included interviews with people from his past, tackling his memoir as if he were reporting on himself. The memoir was excerpted in The New York Times Magazine.

Carr was a mentor for the writer Ta-Nehisi Coates, who said in 2019: "I couldn't imagine myself as a writer if I had not met David Carr. David Carr was the first person who ever believed in me." Carr was also credited for launching Lena Dunham's career and was described by Gawker's John Koblin as the "Daddy" of TV series Girls.

He was featured prominently in the 2011 documentary Page One: Inside the New York Times, where he was shown interviewing staff from Vice, whom Carr called out for their lack of journalistic knowledge.  The article about Vice was noteworthy for its clear depiction of the conflict between new online journalism and traditional journalism.

In 2014, he was named the Lack Professor of Media Studies at Boston University, a part-time position where he taught a journalism class called Press Play: Making and distributing content in the present future.

Personal life
Carr divorced his first wife, Kimberly, in 1986. In 1988, he had twin daughters, Erin and Meagan, with partner Anna Lee. The couple lost custody of the children, who went into foster care until Carr went through rehab and gained custody of the girls. Erin Lee Carr is a documentary film director. He married his second wife, Jill L. Rooney, in 1994; the couple had one child, a daughter, Maddie.

He described himself as a church-going Catholic. He resided in Montclair, New Jersey, with his wife and three daughters.

Carr had previously battled Hodgkin's lymphoma, and reported developing his hoarse speaking voice during his coverage of the aftermath of the September 11 attacks.

Death 

On February 12, 2015, at around 9 p.m. EST, Carr collapsed in the newsroom of The New York Times, and was pronounced dead at Mount Sinai Roosevelt Hospital, at the age of 58. The cause of death was lung cancer, with heart disease listed as a contributing factor.

Legacy
In September 2015, The New York Times announced a fellowship in his name that would be dedicated to fostering the growth and development of journalists. The first three fellowship recipients, chosen by a panel of Times editors from among more than 600 applicants, were John Herrman, a co-editor and media reporter for The Awl; Amanda Hess, a staff writer at Slate; and Greg Howard, a reporter for Deadspin.

In 2016, a David Carr Prize for Emerging Writers at SXSW was presented to author Jaime Boust. The piece was to cover what is exciting (or unnerving) about life in the coming years in 2,000 words or less.

Publications
 The Night of the Gun: A Reporter Investigates the Darkest Story of His Life, His Own. New York: Simon & Schuster, 2008. .

Appearances
 2008: Book Discussion on The Night of the Gun, Olssen's Books & Records, Washington, D.C., "Book TV," C-SPAN 2. September 17, 2008.
 2011: Page One: Inside the New York Times documentary film
 2013: IAmA columnist and reporter on media and culture for the New York Times Reddit interview
 2014: Commencement Address to the UC Berkeley, Graduate School of Journalism Class of 2014

References

External links
 
 The Night of the Gun, by David Carr (official website)
 
 David Carr Fellowship at The New York Times

1956 births
2015 deaths
20th-century American male writers
20th-century American newspaper editors
21st-century American male writers
21st-century American memoirists
American bloggers
American columnists
American male bloggers
Boston University faculty
Catholics from Minnesota
Deaths from lung cancer in New York (state)
Editors of Minnesota newspapers
Editors of Washington, D.C., newspapers
People from Minnetonka, Minnesota
People from Montclair, New Jersey
The New York Times columnists
University of Minnesota alumni
Writers from Minneapolis